Bardeh (also Romanized as Bārdeh) is a village in Vardanjan Rural District of the Central District of Ben County, Chaharmahal and Bakhtiari province, Iran. At the 2006 census, its population was 2,781 in 662 households, when it was in the former Ben District of Shahrekord County. The following census in 2011 counted 2,534 people in 688 households. The latest census in 2016 showed a population of 2,356 people in 728 households, by which time it was in the newly established Ben County, and was the largest village in its rural district.

References 

Ben County

Populated places in Chaharmahal and Bakhtiari Province

Populated places in Ben County